Krasyliv Raion was one of the 20 administrative raions (a district) of Khmelnytskyi Oblast in western Ukraine. The raion's administrative center was located in the city of Krasyliv. Its population was 61,331 in the 2001 Ukrainian Census. The raion was abolished on 18 July 2020 as part of the administrative reform of Ukraine, which reduced the number of raions of Khmelnytskyi Oblast to three. The area of Krasyliv Raion was merged into Khmelnytskyi Raion. The last estimate of the raion population was

Geography
Krasyliv Raion was located in the central part of the Khmelnytskyi Oblast, corresponding to the modern-day boundaries of the Volhynia and Podolia historical regions. One of the main rivers that ran through the raion was the Sluch River, a tributary of the Pripyat. The raion could be accessed nationally via the  national highway and the Southwestern Railways.

History
Krasyliv Raion was first established on March 7, 1923 as a raion of the Shepetivka Okruha during a full-scale administrative reorganization of the Ukrainian Soviet Socialist Republic. From February 3, 1931 to February 26, 1935, Krasyliv Raion did not exist and its territory was instead part of Antoniny Raion, although it was again re-established on February 26, 1935.

Subdivisions

At the time of disestablishment, the raion consisted of four hromadas:
 Antoniny settlement hromada with the administration in the urban-type settlement of Antoniny;
 Krasyliv urban hromada with the administration in the city of Krasyliv;
 Shchyborivka rural hromada with the administration in the selo of Shchyborivka;
 Zasluchne rural hromada with the administration in the selo of Zasluchne.

Krasyliv Raion was divided in a way that followed the general administrative scheme in Ukraine. Local government was also organized along a similar scheme nationwide. Consequently, raions were subdivided into councils, which were the prime level of administrative division in the country.

Each of the raion's urban localities administered their own councils, often containing a few other villages within its jurisdiction. However, only a handful of rural localities were organized into councils, which also might contain a few villages within its jurisdiction.

Accordingly, the Krasyliv Raion was divided into: 
 1 city council—made of the city of Krasyliv (administrative center);
 1 settlement council—made up of the urban-type settlement of Antoniny
 35 village councils

Overall, the raion had a total of 95 populated localities, consisting of one city, one urban-type settlement, and 93 villages.

References

External links

 

Former raions of Khmelnytskyi Oblast
States and territories established in 1923
1923 establishments in Ukraine
States and territories disestablished in 1931
1935 establishments in Ukraine
States and territories established in 1935
Ukrainian raions abolished during the 2020 administrative reform